Ignacio Santiago Aliseda (born 14 March 2000) is an Argentine professional footballer who plays as a winger for Swiss Super League club FC Lugano.

Club career
Aliseda began his career with Defensa y Justicia. He was moved into the club's first-team squad during the 2018–19 Argentine Primera División season. After being an unused substitute for a Copa Argentina match with Argentinos Juniors and Copa Sudamericana ties with El Nacional and Banfield, Aliseda made his professional debut in a 2018 Copa Sudamericana round of sixteen second leg encounter with Primera División counterparts Banfield. He was substituted on for Fabián Bordagaray with twenty minutes left, which preceded him netting Defensa y Justicia's second goal of a 2–0 win in stoppage time.

On 19 February 2020, Aliseda joined MLS side Chicago Fire for an undisclosed fee on a four-year deal. His first appearance came in a 2–0 loss in the MLS is Back Tournament against the San Jose Earthquakes at the ESPN Wide World of Sports Complex on 19 July, which was followed by a goal in his fourth game at home to FC Cincinnati on 25 August in MLS.

On 13 December 2021, it was announced that Aliseda would join Swiss Super League side FC Lugano on 1 January 2022.

International career
In March 2018, Aliseda received a call-up to the Argentina U19s. In 2019, he made the U23s' final squad for the Pan American Games in Peru. He featured in two fixtures as Argentina won the tournament.

Career statistics

Honours
Lugano
Swiss Cup: 2021–22

Argentina U23
 Pan American Games: 2019

References

External links
 Profile at Major League Soccer

2000 births
Living people
Footballers from Buenos Aires
Argentine footballers
Association football forwards
Argentina youth international footballers
Footballers at the 2019 Pan American Games
Pan American Games gold medalists for Argentina
Pan American Games medalists in football
Medalists at the 2019 Pan American Games
Argentine Primera División players
Major League Soccer players
Designated Players (MLS)
Swiss Super League players
Defensa y Justicia footballers
Chicago Fire FC players
FC Lugano players
Argentine expatriate footballers
Argentine expatriate sportspeople in the United States
Expatriate soccer players in the United States
Argentine expatriate sportspeople in Switzerland
Expatriate footballers in Switzerland